Hartlebury is a village and civil parish in Worcestershire, England which is in Wychavon district centred  south of Kidderminster. The civil parish registered a population of 2,549 in the 2001 Census.

The railway station is centred 800 metres east of the village centre and the main settlement is green-buffered from surrounding villages save for a locality Waresley which is contiguous with the village centre.  The south of the parish includes Crossway Green, which hosts a large motel named after Hartlebury; more scantly populated Lincomb and the north comprise Torton.

History

Hartlebury Castle

Hartlebury Castle was built in the mid-13th century as a fortified manor house. Until 2007 it was the residence of the Bishop of Worcester, with two-thirds of the building leased out to Worcestershire County Council as the Worcestershire County Museum. Hartlebury Castle is a Grade I listed building. It is about a mile to the west of the village and half a mile to the west of the church.

Converted buildings

Queen Elizabeth Grammar School 
Queen Elizabeth (I) Grammar School (the regnal number was added in 1952 on the accession of Elizabeth II) was in Hartlebury until 1977. The earliest record of the precursor to the school is in Domesday Book compiled in 1086. Other early accounts date to 1400, well before Harrow and Rugby were founded. The school was granted a Royal Charter by Queen Elizabeth I in 1557. Originally a private boys school, it was taken over by the State, and was closed when it was merged in 1977 with King Charles I Grammar School, Kidderminster, and The Kidderminster Girls High School to form King Charles I School.  The  oldest building standing was converted to a house.  Its magnificent New Building has commanding views over fields and woodland and rescued from demolition by its alumni association.

New Elizabethan School
A very small independent school unconnected educationally with Hartlebury School opened in 2008: the fee-paying New Elizabethan School was set up to cater for children "who have found learning and school attendance difficult" on part of the Hartlebury School site. A private school, for young boys and girls, operated there 1979–2007, Bowbrook School — renamed Hartlebury Independent School in 1999, then Hartlebury School in 2000. In 2007, it became a charitable organisation. Then in 2008 it was re-launched in its new form.

Former buildings

The Worcestershire house

The house later known as The Worcestershire House was a very old house in Hartlebury, dismantled and re-assembled at the Frontier Culture Museum of Virginia, USA, in 1992. The John Smith (Smyth or Smythe) family built it in the 1630s. An example of the Tudor frame variety of Timber framing construction, it was dismantled in 1970 and shipped.

Localities

Waresley
Waresley describes a modest cluster of homes astride the A449 road: chiefly Waresley Road, Manor Court Lane, the street named Waresley Park (as this was a manor), Manor Lane and Waresley Court Road.

Lincomb
On a knoll, the settlement has a Spa and Training centre and an Equestrian centre.  Its immediate west is the slope to the River Severn.

Torton
A long-established automotive gears business and three small farms including Worcestershire pear orchards as to some form the bulk of rural Torton in the north of the parish.

Charlton and Crossway Green
Households equally paying the secular (civil) parish precept — entitled to share the village common facilities are:
Charlton which features Worcestershire County Museum
Crossway Green

Notable people 

The ornithologist Henry Eliot Howard conducted much of his research in the grounds of his home, 'Clareland', which is extant, and is Grade II listed.

See also
Hartlebury Common
List of English and Welsh endowed schools (19th century)

References

Villages in Worcestershire
Wychavon